Exapophyses (singular: Exapophysis) are bony joints present in the cervicals (neck vertebrae) of some pterosaurs. Exapophyses lie on the centrum, the spool-shaped main body of each vertebra, where they are positioned adjacent to the main articulating surfaces between centra. Exapophyses which are next to the cotyle (concave front end of the centrum) are known as preexapophyses while those at the condyle (convex rear end) are called postexapophyses. Exapophyses act as accessory articulations, meaning that they complement the cotyle and condyle, as well as the zygapophyses (plate-like joints which lie on the neural arch above the centrum). The term was coined by Samuel Wendell Williston in 1897 during a description of Pteranodon (which he called "Ornithostoma" at the time). Exapophyses are a defining trait of the pterosaur subgroup Eupterodactyloidea, although they are also known to occur in some ctenochasmatids. Rhamphorhynchids have paired, knob-like extensions on the condyle which are occasionally also termed exapophyses, but these extensions are not distinctly offset and are not considered homologous to the exapophyses of eupterodactyloids and ctenochasmatids.

References 

Pterosaur anatomy